Susi Weigel (1914 - 1990), born in Austria, was a illustrator and animator. She had been the illustrator for some children’s books. There is a kindergarten named after her called Kindergarten Susi Weigel.

References 

Austrian illustrators
1914 births
1990 deaths